The Chief of Staff of the Defence Forces (COS) is charged with the executive management of the Irish Defence Forces, and is the most senior military officer of the Army, Naval Service and Air Corps branches. The Chief of Staff is appointed by the President of Ireland, who is the Supreme Commander of the Defence Forces, on the recommendation of the Minister for Defence subject to the approval of the Government of Ireland. The office of the Chief of Staff consists of his personal staff, a strategic planning office, a public relations section and the military judge.

The Defence Forces Chief of Staff sits on the government's National Security Committee (NSC).

The Chief of Staff delegates remaining executive duties to two deputy chiefs of staff (who hold the rank of major general or equivalent) and one assistant chief of staff (brigadier general or equivalent);
 The Deputy Chief of Staff Operations (D COS Ops) is tasked with operational matters.
 The Deputy Chief of Staff Support (D COS Sp) is tasked with military support matters.
 The Assistant Chief of Staff Support (ACOS Sp) is also tasked with military support matters.

The current Chief of Staff of the Defence Forces is Lieutenant General Seán Clancy. Clancy assumed the role on 29 September 2021.

Current General Staff of the Defence Forces

Overseas

Brigade Commanders
The country is divided into two areas for administrative and operational reasons, and in each area there is an Irish Army infantry brigade. The two brigade group structure envisages distinct operational areas of responsibility for each of the brigades and is supported in their responsibilities by the Naval Service and Air Corps. Each of the Brigade formations and the Air Corps are commanded by a Brigadier General, while the Naval Service is commanded by a Commodore;

List of Irish Chiefs of Staff

See also
Minister for Defence (Ireland)
Director of Military Intelligence (Ireland)
Garda Commissioner

References

 
Military of the Republic of Ireland
Ireland
Lists of Irish people